Yanaqucha (Quechua yana black, very dark, qucha lake, "black lake", Hispanicized spelling Yanacocha) is a lake in Peru located in the Ayacucho Region, Huanta Province, Huanta District. Yanaqucha lies south of the mountain Rasuwillka and northeast of the lake Pampaqucha.

References 

Lakes of Peru
Lakes of Ayacucho Region